This is a list of albums in the Kids' Praise! series. The series features Psalty the Singing Songbook played by Ernie Rettino.

List of Kids' Praise! albums

Original series  albums
The Kids Praise Album! (also known as Kids' Praise! 1: An Explosion of Happiness!) (1980)
Kids' Praise! 3: Funtastic Family! (1982)
Kids' Praise! 8: Play Ball! (1989)

Other Psalty related albums
Psalty's Singalongathon Maranatha Marathon Hallelujah Jubilee! (1984)
First Sunday Sing–Along (1986)
Psalty's Family Christmas Sing-a-long (1988)
Charity Churchmouse: On the Front Line (1988)
Psalty's Non-Stop Sing-a-Long Songs (1988)
The Big Adventures of Little Psalty (1989)
Psalty's Bible Stories, Parables & Songs (1991)
Psalty's Songs for Li'l Praisers (1991)
Psalty's Stocking Stuffer (1993)
Psalty's Funtastic Praise Party 1 (1993)
Songs from Psalty's Kids Bible 1 (1995)
Pow Pow Power to Live God's Way (1996)
Psalty's All New Praise Party 2 (1996)
Psalty's Mighty-Mini Musical: Kids' Praise-a-Luia (1998)
Psalty's Mighty-Mini Musical: Growing Up in God (2001)
Songs from Psalty's Kids Bible 2 (2001)
Faith It! God Loves Me (2011)
Psalty's Great Story Songs (2012)
Songs for Moms & Grandmas (2012)

Psalty's Sleepytime Helpers (1986)
Psalty's Sleepytime Helpers Episode #1  Baby Birdy Bomber
Psalty's Sleepytime Helpers Episode #2: Rough Ridin¹ Rodeo
Psalty's Sleepytime Helpers Episode #3: Kids' Praise Parade
Psalty's Sleepytime Helpers Episode #4: Blooper's Bloopers
Psalty's Sleepytime Helpers Episode #5: Caper at the Castle
Psalty's Sleepytime Helpers Episode #6: Uh-Oh Art Projects
Psalty's Sleepytime Helpers Episode #7: Fearfightin' Farley

Videos
Kids' Praise! 4: Singsational Servants (1985)
Kids' Praise! 5: Psalty's Camping Adventure (1986)
Psalty's Salvation Celebration: The Movie (1992)
Psalty's Funtastic Praise Party (1993)
Psalty's Songs for Li'l Praisers: God Loves Me Sooo Much (1994)
Psalty's Songs for Li'l Praisers: Follow the Leader, Jesus (1994)
Psalty's Songs for Li'l Praisers: Jumpin' Up Joy of the Lord (1994)
Psalty's All-New Praise Party Two (1996)

See also 
Colby's Clubhouse television series (Psalty and Psaltina appeared in episode 5 of season 1, "Check Your Connection".)
Gerbert television series
Solomon the Supersonic Salamander book & audio series
 The Booklets - book & audio series

Christian music albums
Christian music lists
Lists of albums
Discographies of American artists
Children's music albums
Kids' Praise!